Maurice Ronald Buchan  (6 December 1907 – 30 January 2003) was a New Zealand international lawn bowler.

Bowls career
He competed in the first World Bowls Championship in Kyeemagh, New South Wales, Australia in 1966  and won a gold medal in the fours with Norm Lash, Gordon Jolly and Bill O'Neill at the event.

He won the 1964 and 1965 singles title and the 1957 fours title at the New Zealand National Bowls Championships when bowling for the Tui Park Bowls Club.

Honours and awards
In the 1986 Queen's Birthday Honours, Buchan was appointed a Member of the Order of the British Empire, for services to bowling. In 2013, he was an inaugural inductee into the New Zealand Bowls Hall of Fame.

Death
Buchan died in Hamilton in 2003.

References

1907 births
2003 deaths
New Zealand male bowls players
Bowls World Champions
New Zealand Members of the Order of the British Empire
20th-century New Zealand people
21st-century New Zealand people